Joseph King Amankrah is a Ghanaian politician and a member of the first Parliament of the fourth Republic representing the Amenfi West constituency in the Western Region of Ghana.

Early life and education 
Amankrah was born in 1944 at Amenfi West in the Western Region of Ghana. He attended the University of Cape Coast and the University of Bordeaux and obtained his Bachelor of Arts.

Politics 
Amankrah was first elected into Parliament on the ticket of the National Democratic Congress during the 1992 Ghanaian parliamentary election for the Amenfi West constituency in the Western Region of Ghana. He was defeated by Abraham Kofi Ashante during the Parliamentary Primaries. Asante polled 16,085 votes representing 46.70% over his opposition Samuel Alberto Tekyi of the New Patriotic Party who polled 8,311 votes representing 24.10%.

Career 
Chibsah is a teacher by profession and a former member of parliament for the Amenfi West constituency in the Western Region.

Personal life 
He is a Christian.

References 

1944 births
Living people
National Democratic Congress (Ghana) politicians
Ghanaian MPs 1993–1997
Ghanaian educators
University of Cape Coast alumni
People from Western Region (Ghana)
University of Bordeaux alumni
Ghanaian Christians